The European Union (Withdrawal) Act 2019, commonly referred to as the Cooper–Letwin Act, was an Act of the Parliament of the United Kingdom that made provisions for extensions to the period defined under Article 50 of the Treaty on European Union related to the United Kingdom's withdrawal from the European Union. It was introduced to the House of Commons by Labour MP Yvette Cooper and Conservative MP Sir Oliver Letwin on 3 April 2019, in an unusual process where the Government of the United Kingdom did not have control over Commons business that day.

The Act was repealed on 23 January 2020 by the European Union (Withdrawal Agreement) Act 2020.

Provisions
Section 1 of the Act required the Government to allow Parliament to debate a motion to require the prime minister to seek an extension to the period in which the United Kingdom is to negotiate the terms of its withdrawal from the European Union ("Brexit") under Article 50(3) of the Treaty on European Union. The motion must have been moved on the day the Act received royal assent or on the next day, so 8 or 9 April 2019. If Parliament passed the motion then the prime minister was legally obliged to comply with it and seek an extension to a date chosen by Parliament (although the extension must still be agreed to by the EU).

Section 2 streamlined the procedure for amending UK law to reflect the new date for "exit day", the date on which the UK was to leave the EU.

Legislative history

House of Commons First and Second Readings
The Act was originally introduced to the House of Commons as the European Union (Withdrawal) (No. 5) Bill on 3 April 2019, on a day when some of the normal standing orders of the House were suspended to prevent Government business taking precedence over business that other Members of Parliament might wish to undertake. As such, Sir Oliver Letwin tabled a motion which would allow MPs to undertake proceedings on the second, committee, and third reading of the Bill in one day. The motion was passed by one vote.

The UK government opposed the bill at all stages throughout its passing in the House of Commons and the House of Lords. The second reading passed by 5 votes, after closing remarks given by Steve Barclay, Secretary of State for Exiting the European Union, making clear the Government's opposition to the Bill.

House of Commons Committee Stage
During the committee stage, a number of amendments were tabled for the Bill, of which four went to a Division:

House of Commons Third Reading
As there was no report stage, the House of Commons debated and voted on the third reading of the Bill after the committee stage.

The bill was accepted on its third reading by a difference of a single vote once again. The approved Cooper-Letwin bill having passed through the House of Commons subsequently passed the following day to the House of Lords.

House of Lords First and Second Readings
Having passed the House of Commons, the Bill was introduced into the House of Lords by Baroness Hayter of Kentish Town the following day, 4 April 2019. The debate on the Bill was preceded by Lady Hayter introducing a motion to compress the process for having the legislation passed into a single day's sitting through the suspension of two of the House's Standing Orders:

Standing Order 46 (No two stages of a Bill to be taken on one day) be dispensed with to allow the European Union (Withdrawal) (No. 5) Bill to be taken through all its stages this day.
Standing Order 39 (Order of Business) be dispensed with to enable that Bill to be considered after the motions on Economic Affairs Committee reports in the name of Lord Forsyth of Drumlean.

However, a number of Conservative Party peers laid down motions to amend the original business motion, which was regarded as a filibuster attempt, with the tacit approval of the Government, to prevent the Bill passing through the House. Despite a total of seven motions put forward to amend Baroness Hayter's original business motion, which had to be debated and voted on, the original motion eventually passed allowing the Bill to be introduced at First Reading and passed to Second Reading the same day. 

However, the Second Reading debate did not begin until after 7.00pm that night, which led it not being able to pass through all stages on the same day, with instead the Bill passing Second Reading to the Committee Stage to be taken up the following Monday.

House of Lords Committee and Report Stages
Committee Stage began on the afternoon of 8 April 2019 with a total of 8 proposed amendments, but only a single division on whether Clause 2 of the Bill ("Procedure for ensuring domestic legislation matches Article 50 extension") should remain:

Following the Committee Stage, there was an official Report Stage, noting merely that the report on the Bill had been received.

House of Lords Third Reading
With the Committee and Report Stages completed, the Bill moved to Third Reading, when it was passed without a vote and returned to the House of Commons.

Commons vote on Lords amendments and Royal Assent
Having passed through the House of Lords, the Bill returned to the House of Commons for a vote on the five amendments passed by the Upper House late on 8 April. Amendments 1 and 4 were agreed to, while Amendments 2, 3 and 5 were voted on in a division, as was a new amendment placed by Sir William Cash.

Having been passed by both Houses of Parliament, the bill achieved Royal Assent later that evening.

Motion under the Act

On 9 April 2019, the House of Commons debated a motion under the terms of the Act put forward by the Prime Minister, requesting approval for the UK to seek an extension to the Article 50 process to 30 June 2019.

This vote passed with a large majority of 310 votes.

References 

Acts of the Parliament of the United Kingdom relating to the European Union
United Kingdom Acts of Parliament 2019
Brexit
Repealed United Kingdom Acts of Parliament